Gao Kegong (1248–1310) was a Chinese painter, and sometimes poet,  born during the Yuan dynasty, he was known for his landscapes.

He was a good friend and colleague of Zhao Mengfu, and his paintings showed an artistic combination between Han and other minorities during the Yuan Dynasty.

See also
Yuan poetry

External links
China on-site

Yuan dynasty painters
1248 births
1310 deaths
Yuan dynasty poets
Painters from Beijing
Poets from Beijing
13th-century Chinese painters
14th-century Chinese painters